|}

The Golden Cygnet Novice Hurdle is a Grade 1 National Hunt novice hurdle race in Ireland which is for horses aged five years or older. It is run at Leopardstown over a distance of about 2 miles and 6 furlongs (4,426 metres). The race is scheduled to take place each year in late January or early February.

The race was first run in 1999 and is named in honour of Golden Cygnet, a racehorse trained by Edward O'Grady who was fatally injured while racing in 1978. It was awarded Grade 3 status in 2003 and then raised to Grade 2 in 2008. Since 2016 the race has been sponsored and run as the Nathaniel Lacy & Partners Solicitors Novice Hurdle.

Records
Leading jockey since 1999 (4 wins):
 Ruby Walsh –  Boston Bob (2012), Pont Alexandre (2013), Sure Reef (2014), Let's Dance (2017)

Leading trainer since 1999 (8 wins):
 Willie Mullins -  Boston Bob (2012), Pont Alexandre (2013), Sure Reef (2014), Outlander (2015), A Toi Phil (2016),  Let's Dance (2017), Gaillard Du Mesnil (2021), Minella Cocooner (2022)

Winners

See also
 Horse racing in Ireland
 List of Irish National Hunt races

References
Racing Post:

Leopardstown Racecourse
National Hunt hurdle races
National Hunt races in Ireland
Recurring sporting events established in 1999
1999 establishments in Ireland